Tatiana Kulíšková (born 22 March 1961) is a Slovak actress and television presenter. She established herself as an actress with a lead part in the 1984 film . Kulíšková won the Zlatá Slučka award for dubbing.

Kulíšková studied at the Academy of Performing Arts in Bratislava, subsequently joining the Theatre for Children and Youth in Trnava in 1986. She met her partner, actor , at the theatre in Trnava. Together they have a son, Adam.

References

External links 

1961 births
Living people
Czechoslovak film actresses
Czechoslovak stage actresses
Slovak film actresses
Slovak television actresses
Slovak stage actresses
Actors from Bratislava
20th-century Slovak actresses
21st-century Slovak actresses
Slovak television presenters
Slovak women television presenters